Es-Skhul (es-Skhūl, ; meaning kid, young goat) or the Skhul Cave is a prehistoric cave site situated about  south of the city of Haifa, Israel, and about  from the Mediterranean Sea. 

Together with the nearby sites of Tabun Cave, Jamal cave, and the cave at El Wad, Skhul is part of the Nahal Me'arot Nature Reserve, a national park and UNESCO World Heritage Site.

The site was first excavated by Dorothy Garrod during summer of 1929. Several human skeletons were found in the cave, belonging to an ancient species of Homo sapiens. Both Neanderthals and anatomically modern humans were present in the region from 200,000 to 45,000 years ago.

See also
 List of fossil sites (with link directory)
 List of hominina (hominid) fossils (with images)
 Qafzeh Cave
 Qesem cave

References

External links
 
 Jewish Virtual Library
 Israel Ministry of Foreign Affairs

Archaeological sites in Israel
Prehistoric sites in Israel
Paleoanthropological sites
World Heritage Sites in Israel
Neanderthal sites
Caves of Israel